Kachachkut is a village in the Lori Province of Armenia.
The population is mainly self-worked in animal husbandry, horticulture and cultivation.

Internet connection
For the first time ever Kachachkut village gets access to a mobile telephony and internet service with Orange in 2013.
In Kachachkut there is up to 21Mbit/s internet connection and good mobile accessibility.

Architecture
In the village, there is a 13th-century monastery. St. Nshan Monastic Complex of Sedvi is located in the south from the village of Kachachkut of the Lori Province of RA, in the Sedvi canyon. The monastic complex was built in the 13th century and it consists of St. Nshan Church, which is attached to the chapel, belfry, auxiliary buildings and the remains of the walls.

Tourism
Kachachkut is a perfect destination for hiking, camping. There are forests nearby and you can also find a lot of blueberries and red raspberries. Locals are very welcoming, during the summer season they collect and sell products to visitors of the village.

References 

Populated places in Lori Province